Abu Ali al-Khayyat (220 AH ( CE)), often called by the Latin title Albohali in western sources, (also called Albohali Alghihac, Albohali Alchait or Albenahait), was an Arab astrologer and a student of the astrologer and astronomer Mashallah ibn Athari.

Al-Khayyat's  was translated in 1136 and 1153, and was reprinted in Nuremberg in 1546. His  appeared in the 12th century Book of Nine Judges.

Biography
He was an Arab astrologer and a student of the astrologer and astronomer Mashallah ibn Athari.

Works

Al-Khayyat's  ("Book of Birth") was translated into Latin by Plato Tiburtinus in 1136, and again by Johannes Hispalensis in 1153, the latter being printed in Nuremberg in 1546 under the title .

Elements of his  ("Book of the secret action"), were republished in the 12th century Book of Nine Judges, compiled by Hugo of Santalla. The material has been described as being largely taken from the work of Mashalla, but in several places borrowing from the work of the Persian astrologer Omar Tiberiades.

See also
 Latin translations of the 12th century

References

Sources

Further reading
 
 

Writers of the medieval Islamic world
Astrologers of the medieval Islamic world
Astronomers of the medieval Islamic world
Astronomers from the Abbasid Caliphate
830s deaths
Year of birth unknown
9th-century astrologers
Year of birth uncertain
9th-century Arabs